Hamid Frangieh (6 August 1907 – 5 September 1981) was a Lebanese member of the Parliament of Lebanon and held numerous ministerial positions in the Lebanese government. He was one of the Maronite leaders of Lebanon.

Early life
Hamid was born in Ehden Lebanon, the son of Kabalan Suleimen Frangieh and Lamia Raffoul from Ejbah Lebanon. The family had a long history of public service, his grandfather (1847-1908) acting as District Governor; his father, a member of Parliament (in 1929); and his brother Suleiman becoming President of Lebanon.

Hamid attended "Frères des Ecoles Chrétiennes" school in Tripoli, for his primary education, then to Aintoura for his secondary education. In 1930, he graduated in law from the Université de Saint-Joseph in Beirut.

His early career was both in the law and journalism, with Hamid becoming one of the cofounders and columnists of the Le Jour newspaper in 1933.

Government career
Frangieh was elected as a member of Parliament for the first time in 1932 at age of 25. In 1937 he became the sole member of the opposition in North Lebanon to be elected. He was elected again on a further five times in 1943, 1947, 1951, 1953 and 1957 before he withdrew from political life due to illness. He was instrumental in ensuring UNESCO's first world conference was held in Beirut.

During his tenure as a member of Parliament, he also held ministerial offices, including as follows:
 Minister of Finance (July 1944 - January 1945)
 Minister of Foreign Affairs and Minister of Education (1945 - 1949)
 Minister of Foreign Affairs and Emigration, resigned 2 months later due to ill health (1941, 1955)

Personal life
In 1941 he married his cousin and they had six children: Kabalan, Samir, Nabil, Marie-Claude, Zeina and Liliane.

References

External links
Hamid Frangieh on Ehden Family Tree Website

1907 births
1981 deaths
People from Zgharta
Lebanese Maronites
Finance ministers of Lebanon
Foreign ministers of Lebanon
Members of the Parliament of Lebanon
Hamid Beik
Candidates for President of Lebanon